Bikram Sarkar is an Indian politician. He was elected to the Lok Sabha, the Lower house of Indian Parliament from Howrah in 1998 and from Panskura in 2000 in a bye election as a candidate of the Trinamool Congress.

References

External links
 Official biographical sketch in Parliament of India website

1939 births
Lok Sabha members from West Bengal
India MPs 1998–1999
India MPs 1999–2004
Living people
People from Murshidabad district
People from Howrah district
People from Paschim Medinipur district
Bharatiya Janata Party politicians from West Bengal
Trinamool Congress politicians from West Bengal